Northlake is a town in Denton County, Texas, United States. The population was 5,201 in 2020.

Geography

Northlake is located at  (33.082495, –97.252975).

Demographics

As of the 2020 United States census, there were 5,201 people, 1,331 households, and 679 families residing in the town.

Education
Northlake is served by the Northwest Independent School District and the Argyle Independent School District

References

External links
 Town of Northlake official website

Towns in Denton County, Texas
Towns in Texas
Dallas–Fort Worth metroplex